The 2002 winners of the Torneo di Viareggio (in English, the Viareggio Tournament, officially the Viareggio Cup World Football Tournament Coppa Carnevale), the annual youth football tournament held in Viareggio, Tuscany, are listed below.

Format

The 40 teams are seeded in 10 pools, split up into 5-pool groups. Each team from a pool meets the others in a single tie. The winning club from each pool and three best runners-up from both group A and group B progress to the final knockout stage. All matches in the final rounds are single tie. The Round of 16 envisions penalties and no extra time, while the rest of the final round matches include 30 minutes extra time with Golden goal rule and penalties to be played if the draw between teams still holds. Semifinal losing teams play 3rd-place final with penalties after regular time. The winning sides play the final with extra time, noGolden goal rule and repeat the match if the draw holds.

Participating teams
Italian teams

  Atalanta
  Bari
  Brescia
  Castel di Sangro
  Cittadella
  Empoli
  Fiorentina
  Inter Milan
  Juventus
  Lazio
  Milan
  Napoli
  Palermo
  Parma
  Perugia
  Piacenza
  Reggina
  Roma
  Salernitana
  Ternana
  Torino
  Verona
  Vicenza

European teams

  Anderlecht
  Bayern Munich
  Belasica
  Deportivo Español
  Feyenoord
  Nice
  Slavia Prague
  Red Star Belgrade
  UTA Arad

Asian teams

  Jerusalem
  Maccabi Haifa

African teams
  Great African Stars
American teams

  New York United
  Pumas
  Desportiva Capixaba
  Independiente Santa Fe

Oceanian teams
  APIA Tigers

Group stage

Group 1

Group 2

Group 3

Group 4

Group 5

Group 6

Group 7

Group 8

Group 9

Group 10

Knockout stage

Champions

Notes

External links
 Official Site (Italian)
 Results on RSSSF.com

2002
2001–02 in European football
2001–02 in Italian football
2002 in Palestinian football
2001–02 in Ghanaian football
2002 in American soccer
2002 in Australian soccer
2002 in Colombian football
2001–02 in Mexican football
2002 in Brazilian football